The renal outer medullary potassium channel (ROMK) is an ATP-dependent potassium channel (Kir1.1) that transports potassium out of cells.  It plays an important role in potassium recycling in the thick ascending limb (TAL) and potassium secretion in the cortical collecting duct (CCD) of the nephron.  In humans, ROMK is encoded by the  KCNJ1 (potassium inwardly-rectifying channel, subfamily J, member 1) gene. Multiple transcript variants encoding different isoforms have been found for this gene.

Function 

Potassium channels are present in most mammalian cells, where they participate in a wide range of physiologic responses. The protein encoded by this gene is an integral membrane protein and inward-rectifier type potassium channel. It is inhibited by internal ATP and probably plays an important role in potassium homeostasis. The encoded protein has a greater tendency to allow potassium to flow into a cell rather than out of a cell, which has  (hence the term "inwardly rectifying" referring to corresponding currents in electrophysiology, but has limited physiological relevance). ROMK was identified as the pore-forming component of the mitochondrial ATP-sensitive potassium (mitoKATP) channel, known to play a critical role in cardioprotection against ischemic-reperfusion injury in the heart as well as in the protection against hypoxia-induced brain injury from stroke or other ischemic attacks.

Klotho is a beta-glucuronidase-like enzyme that activates ROMK by removal of sialic acid.

Clinical significance 

Mutations in this gene have been associated with antenatal Bartter syndrome, which is characterized by salt wasting, hypokalemic alkalosis, hypercalciuria, and low blood pressure.

Role in hypokalemia and magnesium deficiency 
The ROMK channels are inhibited by magnesium in the nephron's normal physiologic state. In states of hypokalemia (a state of potassium deficiency), concurrent magnesium deficiency results in a state of hypokalemia that may be more difficult to correct with potassium replacement alone. This may be directly due to decreased inhibition of the outward potassium current in states where magnesium is low. Conversely, magnesium deficiency alone is not likely to cause a state of hypokalemia. Sgk1 kinase has also been reported to phosphorylate ROMK, resulting in an increase of channels on the apical surface of the distal tubule. Sgk1 is in turn regulated by the mineralocorticoid receptor such an effect may contribute to the kaliuretic action of aldosterone.

References

Further reading

External links 
 
 NDI terminology page

Ion channels